Borz-e Rafiabad (also Romanized as Borz-e Rafī‘ābād; also known as Rafāhābād, Rafī‘ābād, and Refāhābād) is a village in Rud Ab-e Sharqi Rural District, Rud Ab District, Narmashir County, Kerman Province, Iran. At the 2006 census, its population was 174, in 47 families.

References 

Populated places in Narmashir County